Bayview, Washington  may refer to:

Bayview, Island County, Washington, an unincorporated community in Island County
Bayview, Pierce County, Washington, an unincorporated community in Pierce County
Bay View, Washington, a census-designated place in Skagit County